Auratonota foederata is a species of moth of the family Tortricidae. It is found in Ecuador.

The wingspan is about 16 mm. It is similar to Auratonota nugax.

References

Moths described in 2000
Auratonota
Moths of South America